
This is a list of aircraft in alphabetical order beginning with 'Tg'.

Tg

TGA 
(Talleres Generales de Aviación)
 Sea Teul Zacateca - Antonio Sea

References

Further reading

External links 

 List of aircraft (T)